Foieni is a commune of 1,836 inhabitants situated in Satu Mare County, Romania. It is composed of a single village, Foieni.

It borders Hungary to the west, the city of Carei to the east, Ciumești commune to the south, and Urziceni commune to the north.

The  is a  protected area located on the territory of the commune.

Demographics
Ethnic groups (2011 census): 
Hungarians: 69% (55.52% in 2002)
Germans: 21.1% (41.60% in 2002)
Romanis: 5.6% (0.00% in 2002)
Romanians: 3.7% (2.81% in 2002)

According to mother tongue, 96.38% of the population speak Hungarian as their first language.

References

Communes in Satu Mare County
Hungarian German communities